Last of the Summer Wine's seventeenth series aired on BBC1. All of the episodes were written by Roy Clarke and produced and directed by Alan J. W. Bell.

Outline
The trio in this series consisted of:

List of episodes
Regular series

Christmas Special (1995)

DVD release
The box set for series seventeen was released by Universal Playback in December 2010, mislabelled as a box set for series 17 & 18.

References

See also

Last of the Summer Wine series
1995 British television seasons